Roseville may refer to:

Australia
Roseville, New South Wales

Canada
Roseville, Ontario

Malta
RoseVille (aka Villa Roseville), a house in Attard, Malta

South Africa
Roseville, Pretoria, a suburb

United Kingdom
Roseville, Dudley

United States
Roseville, Arkansas, in Logan County, Arkansas
Roseville, California, the largest city with the name
Roseville-Fleetridge, San Diego, California
Roseville, Illinois
Roseville, Iowa
Roseville, Michigan
Roseville, Minnesota
Roseville Township, Minnesota (disambiguation), several locations
Roseville, Newark, New Jersey
Roseville, Ohio
Roseville, Jefferson County, Pennsylvania
Roseville, Pennsylvania (in Tioga County)
Roseville, Virginia

Other uses
Roseville High School (disambiguation)
Roseville station (disambiguation), stations of the name
Roseville pottery, named for Roseville, Ohio